Jurgen Streppel (born 25 June 1969) is a Dutch professional football manager and former player, who is the current technical director of Helmond Sport.

Playing career
Born in Voorst, Streppel began his professional career in 1990 as a midfielder at Helmond Sport in the second-tier Eerste Divisie. After two seasons he moved to RKC Waalwijk, where he played in the top-tier Eredivisie until 1997. In the 1993–94 season, he was loaned to Eerste Divisie club Telstar. From 1997 to 2005, Streppel played for Helmond Sport again. In total, he made 373 appearances in which he scored 57 goals.

Managerial career
Already in 1995, Streppel began his coaching career as a youth coach at Helmond Sport where he also was a player for the first team. He worked as a youth coach for several years until 2006, where he became assistant manager of the first team under Jan Poortvliet. From 2008 to the summer of 2011, he was head coach of Helmond Sport. On 1 July 2011, Streppel was appointed head coach of Willem II, where signed a contract extension in January 2015 until mid-2017. After the 2012–13 season, Streppel suffered relegation with Willem II to the Eerste Divisie, but they returned to the Eredivisie a year later.

Streppel signed a two-year contract with SC Heerenveen in March 2016, which would go into effect in July of the same year, after his fifth season with Willem II. He succeeded Foppe de Haan. Streppel was succeeded at Willem II by Erwin van de Looi, who came over from FC Groningen. On 13 March 2018, it was announced that Streppel would leave Heerenveen after the 2017–18 season. In October 2018, Streppel was appointed manager of Anorthosis Famagusta in Cyprus, where he had to wait three months for salary payment.

In June 2019, Streppel was appointed manager of Al Jazira in Abu Dhabi. He left the role in October 2019 after only three matches.

On 10 June 2020, Streppel was appointed manager of Roda JC Kerkrade. In October 2021, he extended his deal until June 2024. However, on 15 December 2022, Roda confirmed, that Streppel had left the club and would return to Helmond Sport as technical director.

Managerial statistics

References

External links
 Jurgen Streppel at Voetbal International

1969 births
Living people
People from Voorst
Dutch footballers
Dutch football managers
RKC Waalwijk players
Helmond Sport players
SC Telstar players
Eredivisie players
Eerste Divisie players
Helmond Sport managers
Anorthosis Famagusta F.C. managers
Roda JC Kerkrade managers
Eredivisie managers
UAE Pro League managers
Eerste Divisie managers
Association football midfielders
Expatriate football managers in Cyprus
Dutch expatriate football managers
Dutch expatriate sportspeople in Cyprus
Expatriate football managers in the United Arab Emirates
Dutch expatriate sportspeople in the United Arab Emirates
Footballers from Gelderland